Foreign relations exist between Azerbaijan and Switzerland. Azerbaijan has an embassy in Bern as does Switzerland in Baku. Both countries are full members of the Council of Europe and the Organization for Security and Co-operation in Europe (OSCE).

Economic cooperation

In November 1998, delegates of the two countries met and agreed to improve and expand their economic relations and the Swiss Government agreed to give a $US 50 million credit to Azerbaijan.

Switzerland considers Azerbaijan an important country for economic development cooperation according to the Swiss State Secretariat for Economic Affairs 
The Azeri president has stressed the importance of the ties between the two nations.
An intergovernmental agreement on trade and economic cooperation was signed in Baku in October 2000.

The Swiss Foreign Affairs minister visited the Azeri President in February 2006, where the two stressed the importance of their relationship. During this visit, the focus was primarily on economic cooperation, however, the minister raised the issue of Azerbaijan's conflict with Armenia This was followed by a visit by the Swiss Energy Minister in October 2007, after which an energy agreement was signed.

Further emphasis was placed on the relationship and further development made in a visit by the Swiss foreign affairs minister to Baku in May 2009, where his Azeri counterpart said his country placed "great importance to boosting cooperation with Switzerland" and expressed hopes of deepening the existing bilateral ties.

European Union
Switzerland has had a role in developing relations between Azerbaijan and the European Union, with Swiss officials advocating closer ties between the EU and Azerbaijan in order to provide energy security for Europe. Switzerland has also provided 'neutral ground' for Azeri officials to meet with delegates of Western organisations and governments.

Diplomacy

Republic of Azerbaijan
Bern (Embassy) 

Republic of Switzerland
Baku (Embassy)

See also
 Foreign relations of Azerbaijan
 Foreign relations of Switzerland
 Azerbaijanis in Switzerland
 Azerbaijanis in Europe
 Swisses in Azerbaijan

References

External links 
 Swiss embassy in Baku
 Azerbaijani embassy in Bern

 
Switzerland
Bilateral relations of Switzerland